This list comprises Danish supercentenarians (people from Denmark who have attained the age of at least 110 years), according to the Gerontology Research Group (GRG). The oldest Dane is Christian Mortensen, who emigrated to the United States in 1903, where he died on 25 April 1998, aged 115 years, 252 days. The oldest person to be born and die in Denmark is Karla Lindholm Jensen, who died on 10 December 2020, aged 112 years, 217 days.

Danish supercentenarians

Notes

References 

Danish